There's Something About a Soldier is a 1943 American drama film directed by Alfred E. Green and starring Tom Neal, Evelyn Keyes and Bruce Bennett. It takes its title from a popular song of the same name.

The film's sets were designed by the art director Lionel Banks.

Plot
During World War II, a group of fresh candidates arrive at an officer training school in Wilimington in North Carolina. Despite their rivalries they learn to work together during the seventeen week course.

Main cast
 Tom Neal as Wally Williams  
 Evelyn Keyes as Carol Harkness  
 Bruce Bennett as Frank Molloy  
 John Hubbard as Michael Crocker  
 Jeff Donnell as Jean Burton  
 Frank Sully as Alex Grybinski  
 Lewis Wilson as Thomas Bolivar Jefferson  
 Robert Stanford as George Edwards  
 Jonathan Hale as General Sommerton  
 Hugh Beaumont as Lieutenant Martin  
 Shelley Winters as Norma 
 Louise Beavers as Birdie
 Jeanne Bates as Phyllis

References

Bibliography
 Wilt, David E. Hardboiled in Hollywood. Popular Press, 1991.

External links
 

1943 films
American drama films
Columbia Pictures films
Films directed by Alfred E. Green
American World War II films
Films set in North Carolina
American black-and-white films
1943 drama films
1940s English-language films
1940s American films